Narianganam is a very small town in Kottayam district, state of Kerala, India. It is 9 km northwest of the Town of Pala.

Landmarks
 
 Narianganam Library
 St. Mary magadelens School
 Nursery School
 Thalappalam Service Cooperative Bank
 St. Mary Magadelens Church
 Primary Health Center

Transportation
Nearest cities and towns[edit]
Nearest Airport - Cochin International Airport

Nearest Railway Station- Kottayam railway station

Distance to Cochin - 80 km (49 mi.)

Distance to Kottayam - 37 km (23 mi.)

Distance to Pala - 9 km (5.6 mi.)

Distance to Bharananganam - 4 km (2.5 mi.)

References

Villages in Kottayam district